Velimir Šandor (born 6 October 1985) is a Croatian Paralympic athlete. He won the silver medal in the men's discus throw F52 event at the 2020 Summer Paralympics in Tokyo, Japan. He also represented Croatia at the 2016 Summer Paralympics in Rio de Janeiro, Brazil and he won the bronze medal in the men's discus throw F52 event.

References

External links 
 

1985 births
Living people
Sportspeople from Zagreb
Paralympic medalists in athletics (track and field)
Athletes (track and field) at the 2016 Summer Paralympics
Athletes (track and field) at the 2020 Summer Paralympics
Medalists at the 2016 Summer Paralympics
Medalists at the 2020 Summer Paralympics
Paralympic silver medalists for Croatia
Paralympic bronze medalists for Croatia
Paralympic athletes of Croatia
Croatian male discus throwers
Medalists at the World Para Athletics Championships
Medalists at the World Para Athletics European Championships
21st-century Croatian people